The Microsoft Layer for Unicode (MSLU) is a software library for legacy versions of Windows, simplifying the creation of Unicode-aware programs on Windows 9x (Windows 95, Windows 98, and Windows Me). It is also known as UnicoWS (Unicode for Windows 95/98/Me Systems) or by its filename, .

Microsoft described it as providing "a layer over the Win32 API on Windows 95/98/Me so that a software developer can write a single Unicode version of their application and have it run properly on all platforms." Previously, developers had to either provide two separate versions of an application, or perform complex string translations and API decisions at runtime.

In the present, UnicoWS can be used to compile newer software, which often expects Unicode support, (partially due to the influential "UTF-8 Everywhere" manifesto,) for legacy versions of Windows. UnicoWS can also be used at link time to compile software in languages that did not exist contemporaneously with Windows 9x and require Unicode support, like Rust.

Alternatives exist, among them , "The Open Layer for Unicode for Windows", an abandonware yet free (MPL 1.1/GPL 2.0/LGPL 2.1 licensed) re-implementation of the MSLU by Mozilla.

Availability
The MSLU was announced in March 2001, and was first made available as a compatibility layer for Unicode-supporting code written for the then-new Windows XP RC1 in the July 2001 edition of Microsoft's Platform SDK. This drew criticism from developers who feel it was "too late", as it was released long past the peak popularity of Windows 9x and only one month before the release to manufacturing of Windows XP. MSLU was given the codename Godot, a reference to Waiting for Godot, a play centered around the failure of a man named "Godot" to arrive and the endless wait for him, because such a Unicode compatibility layer was thought—even inside Microsoft—to have been long overdue.

How it works
On Windows 9x, only the  versions are implemented and attempting to call a  version will fail with an error code that indicates that the function is unimplemented.

When a wide-character function is called for the first time at runtime, the function stub in  first receives control and checks if it is running on a Windows 95/98/Me system:
 If so, it dynamically loads  (if it hasn't been loaded yet) and passes control to the corresponding thunking stub in there. The thunking stub translates the wide-character arguments into ANSI strings and then invokes the native  version from the OS, and translates any returned strings back into wide character format.
 If the OS natively supports the  version (i.e. the Windows NT line of operating systems), then the function stub updates the in-memory symbol table so that future calls will directly invoke the native  version without any more overhead.

This results in some applications, such as OpenOffice.org, showing an error with the message "Application cannot start because one of the required libraries cannot be found." This occurs even if  is installed in the system, as it cannot start without its dependencies (see also DLL hell).

References

External links

Microsoft

 Official announcement of availability
 MSDN Magazine article describing MSLU
 MSDN programming reference pages
 Michael Kaplan's blog entries about MSLU internals
 Download of MSLU redistributable (UNICOWS.DLL)
 Known bugs in each released MSLU version — formerly maintained by Michael Scott Kaplan, an employee of Microsoft who was the principal developer and maintainer for MSLU.

Open source alternatives

 libunicows — provides an MIT-licensed version of only the UNICOWS.LIB link-library, but still requires the Microsoft-provided  or Mozilla's .
 opencow (previously MZLU) — reimplements both the DLL and LIB link-library as MPL 1.1/GPL 2.0/LGPL 2.1, originally for and by Mozilla.

Layer for Unicode
Unicode